Michael Drake Bradner (March 3, 1937 – February 27, 2021) was an American politician who served in the Alaska House of Representatives from 1967 to 1977.

Biography
Bradner attended high school in Indiana and lived in the state of Washington before first moving to Alaska for a summer job on freight boats in the Yukon River. He graduated from University of Alaska Fairbanks. Following his marriage, Bradner became a journalist, first working for the Fairbanks Daily News-Miner.

In 1965, Bradner became a legislative assistant, and was elected to the state house in his own right during the next election cycle, serving through 1977. He served as Speaker of the Alaska House of Representatives from 1975 to 1977. In 1976, Bradner campaigned as a political independent, for a seat on the Alaska Senate, after losing a Democratic party primary to Richard Greuel. Bradner was a legislative aide to Steve Cowper's gubernatorial administration until resigning the position in January 1987.

Bradner and his first wife Janet raised four daughters. He later married Jeanne, with whom he had two biological daughters, and raised two foster daughters. Bradner died from complications of COVID-19 in Anchorage, Alaska, on February 27, 2021, at age 83, during the COVID-19 pandemic in Alaska, four days short of his 84th birthday.

References

1937 births
2021 deaths
Alaska Independents
American male journalists
Deaths from the COVID-19 pandemic in Alaska
Journalists from Alaska
Politicians from Washington, D.C.
Speakers of the Alaska House of Representatives
Democratic Party members of the Alaska House of Representatives
University of Alaska Fairbanks alumni
20th-century American journalists
20th-century American male writers
20th-century American politicians